Micromimus is a genus of true weevils in the beetle family Curculionidae. There are about 18 described species in Micromimus.

Species
These 18 species belong to the genus Micromimus:

 Micromimus ausus Kuschel, 1959
 Micromimus batesi Wollaston & T.V., 1873
 Micromimus boliviensis Hustache, 1938
 Micromimus brevis Kuschel, 1959
 Micromimus continuus Champion & G.C., 1909
 Micromimus corticalis (Boheman, 1845)
 Micromimus crassicornis Hustache, 1938
 Micromimus cribrosus Champion & G.C., 1909
 Micromimus dehiscens Champion & G.C., 1909
 Micromimus elongatulus Hustache, 1932
 Micromimus fulvus Hustache, 1932
 Micromimus germaini Kuschel, 1959
 Micromimus minimus Champion & G.C., 1909
 Micromimus nigrescens Wollaston & T.V., 1873
 Micromimus orcus Davis & Engel, 2007
 Micromimus osellai Voss, 1968
 Micromimus ovatulus Hustache, 1938
 Micromimus pumilio Wollaston & T.V., 1873

References

Further reading

 
 
 

Cossoninae
Articles created by Qbugbot